William Allan Carroll (born January 19, 1959) is a Canadian former professional ice hockey centre. Carroll played in the National Hockey League (NHL) from 1981 to 1987 for the New York Islanders, Edmonton Oilers and Detroit Red Wings. He won the Stanley Cup four times, from 1981 to 1983 with the Islanders, and in 1985 with the Oilers. Carroll was born in Toronto, Ontario, and grew up in West Rouge on the eastern border of Toronto].

Playing career
Carroll was drafted in the second round (38th overall) by the New York Islanders in the 1979 NHL Entry Draft from the London Knights of the Ontario Hockey League (OHL). He won the Stanley Cup three times with New York in 1981, 1982, and 1983. He was claimed off waivers by the Edmonton Oilers on October 9, 1984, at the beginning of the 1984-85 NHL season and won the Stanley Cup a fourth time that season at the age of 26. Carroll played two more seasons in the NHL with the Detroit Red Wings before retiring in 1987.

Personal information
He has three sons, in order of birth, Michael and Matthew, who played professional lacrosse for the Toronto Rock of the NLL, while the youngest, Marcus Carroll, played professional ice hockey with the Utah Grizzlies of the ECHL. His two nephews also play hockey: Leo Jenner (born 1989), played major junior hockey in the Ontario Hockey League with the Plymouth Whalers, and played college hockey four seasons while attending Acadia University; and Leo's brother Boone Jenner (born 1993), who was drafted in the 2nd round of the 2011 NHL Entry Draft by the Columbus Blue Jackets, and is currently serving as the club's team captain.

Career statistics

Regular season and playoffs

Awards and achievements
 1981 - Stanley Cup Champion - New York Islanders
 1982 - Stanley Cup Champion - New York Islanders
 1983 - Stanley Cup Champion - New York Islanders
 1985 - Stanley Cup Champion - Edmonton Oilers

References

External links

1959 births
Living people
Canadian ice hockey centres
Detroit Red Wings players
Edmonton Oilers players
Indianapolis Checkers (CHL) players
London Knights players
New York Islanders draft picks
New York Islanders players
Nova Scotia Oilers players
People from Pickering, Ontario
St. Michael's Buzzers players
Ice hockey people from Toronto
Stanley Cup champions